A crime of passion refers to violence, especially murder, that the perpetrator commits because of sudden strong impulse.

Crime of passion or crimes of passion may also refer to:

Film and television

 Crime of Passion (1957 film), directed by Gerd Oswald
 Crimes of Passion (1984 film), directed by Ken Russell
 Crimes of Passion (2013 film), directed by Gao Qunshu
 Crimes of Passion (TV series), a Swedish television series
 Crimenes de Lujuria (Crimes of Passion), a 2011 Mexican direct-to-video film featuring Alejandra Ambrosi
 Love Crime, directed by Alain Corneau

Literature 

 A Crime of Passion, a novel by Mary Higgins Clark
 Crimes of Passion, a play by Joe Orton
 Crime of Passion, a character play by Jérôme Pradon
 Crime Passionel, also known as Dirty Hands, a 1948 play by Jean-Paul Sartre

Art 

 Crime passionnel, oil painting by Nils von Dardel

Music 

 Crimes of Passion (Pat Benatar album), 1980 release from Chrysalis Records
 Crimes of Passion (Crocodiles album), 2013 release from French Kiss Records
 "Crime of Passion" (Mike Oldfield song), 1984 recording
 "Crime of Passion" (Ricky Van Shelton song), 1987 recording
 "Crime of Passion", from the 1975 album Unrequited by Loudon Wainwright III
 "Crime of Passion", from the 1985 album Eaten Alive by Diana Ross
 “Crime of Passion”, from the 1986 album All Right Now by Pepsi & Shirlie
 "Crime of Passion", from the 2006 album Edge of the World by Glenn Tipton